The M-37 or 82-BM-37 (батальонный миномёт, battalion mortar) is a Soviet 82 millimeter calibre mortar designed by B.I. Szayrin and accepted into service in 1937.  The design of the M-37 is based on the earlier French Brandt mle 27/31 mortar with Russian modifications.  The main difference between the 82-PM-37 and the earlier 82-PM-36 was the adoption of a round base-plate, revised traverse/elevation controls, simplified sights and spring-loaded shock absorbers on the bi-pod to reduce the amount of relaying needed between shots. It was designed to be able to fire western 81 mm captured ammunition whilst not permitting the enemy the same advantage  The German designation for captured M-37 mortars was 8.2 cm GrW 274/2(r).

The M-37M is an improved version with lighter base plate and a device to prevent double loading.

It was produced in China by Norinco as the Type 53, in Egypt by the Helwan Machine Tools Company as the Model 69 and in Bulgaria by Arsenal as the M-82 Mod 1937.

Operators 

 
 
 : over 1,000 in service.
 : Type 53
 
 
 : Type 53
 
 
 : Helwan M 69 82 mm mortar
 
 
 
 
 
 : 50 in service.
  use by Indonesian Marine Corps in 1960s
 
 
 
 
  People's Republic of Kampuchea
 
 
 : Armed Forces of Malta
 
 
 
 
 
 
 
 
 
  200 in service.
 : Type 53
 
 : Type 53
 
 
 : a few BM-37s used during the battle of Khe Sanh
 : BM-37 and Type 53

References 

 

Cold War weapons of the Soviet Union
World War II infantry mortars of the Soviet Union
82 mm artillery
Military equipment introduced in the 1930s
82 mm mortars